WJYI (1230 kHz) was a soft oldies and adult standards formatted radio station. It was licensed to Norfolk, Virginia and served the Hampton Roads region of Virginia. WJYI was owned by Saga Communications, Inc. and operated under their Tidewater Communications, LLC licensee. It featured programming from "America's Best Music" syndicated by Westwood One.

Transmission
WJYI was a Class C station, transmitting with 627 watts, using a non-directional antenna. The station's transmitter was off East Indian River Road in Norfolk, near the Campostella Bridge. Programming continues to be heard on a digital subchannel of sister station WNOR 98.7-HD2.

History
On May 1, 1949, the station first signed on the air. The original call sign was WNOR. The WJOI call letters and those of co-owned WJYI in Milwaukee swapped on April 29, 2021.

On September 30, 2021, WJYI's license was surrendered to the FCC.

References

External links
FCC Station Search Details: DWJYI  (Facility ID: 67081)
FCC History Cards for WJYI (covering 1944-1981 as WKAZ / WNOR)

1949 establishments in Virginia
2021 disestablishments in Virginia
Radio stations established in 1949
Radio stations disestablished in 2021
JYI
JYI
Defunct radio stations in the United States
JYI